The 2018 Supercopa Argentina Final was the 7th edition of the Supercopa Argentina, an annual football match contested by the winners of the Argentine Primera División and Copa Argentina competitions. Initially the match was scheduled for 4 April 2019 at the Estadio Malvinas Argentinas in Mendoza but it was rescheduled for 2 May 2019.

Boca Juniors and Rosario Central qualified after winning the 2017–18 Argentine Primera División tournament and the 2017–18 Copa Argentina, respectively.

Boca Juniors won the match via a penalty shoot-out after the game had finished 0–0. It was their first Supercopa Argentina title.

Qualified teams

Match

Details

Statistics

References 

2019 in Argentine football
2018
Supercopa Argentina 2018
Rosario Central matches